The 2011 ARCA Racing Series presented by Menards is the 59th season of the ARCA Racing Series. The season included nineteen races, down from twenty, and began with the Lucas Oil Slick Mist 200 at Daytona International Speedway and ending with the Federated Car Care 200 at Toledo Speedway. Ty Dillon of Richard Childress Racing won the season championship.

Teams and drivers

Complete schedule

Notes

Schedule
The 2011 series schedule was announced in December 2010.

Calendar changes

Palm Beach International Raceway, Texas Motor Speedway, Mansfield Motorsports Park, and Rockingham Speedway were removed from the schedule.
Winchester Speedway, Lucas Oil Raceway, and Madison International Speedway were added to the schedule.
Salem Speedway's race date was moved from April to May.
New Jersey Motorsports Park's race date moved from August to May.
Chicagoland Speedway's race date was moved from August to June to coincide with the STP 300 Nationwide Series race.
Winchester Speedway was added to the schedule.
Berlin Raceway's race date moved from August to July.
The Federated Car Care 200, held at Toledo Speedway, was moved from September to October, causing it to become the season ending race.

Results and standings

Races

Standings

Full Drivers' Championship
(key) Bold – Pole position awarded by time. Italics – Pole position set by final practice results or rainout. * – Most laps led.

See also
2011 NASCAR Sprint Cup Series
2011 NASCAR Nationwide Series
2011 NASCAR Camping World Truck Series
2011 NASCAR Canadian Tire Series
2011 NASCAR Corona Series

References

External links

ARCA
ARCA Menards Series seasons